Hồng Bàng refers to the Hồng Bàng dynasty, ruling Vietnam from 2879 to 258 BC.

Hồng Bàng may also refer to:

Hồng Bàng District, of Hai Phong, Vietnam.
Hồng Bàng University, a private university in Ho Chi Minh City, Vietnam.